The meridian 82° east of Greenwich is a line of longitude that extends from the North Pole across the Arctic Ocean, Asia, the Indian Ocean, the Southern Ocean, and Antarctica to the South Pole.

The 82nd meridian east forms a great circle with the 98th meridian west.

From Pole to Pole
Starting at the North Pole and heading south to the South Pole, the 82nd meridian east passes through:

{| class="wikitable plainrowheaders"
! scope="col" width="120" | Co-ordinates
! scope="col" | Country, territory or sea
! scope="col" | Notes
|-
| style="background:#b0e0e6;" | 
! scope="row" style="background:#b0e0e6;" | Arctic Ocean
| style="background:#b0e0e6;" |
|-valign="top"
| style="background:#b0e0e6;" | 
! scope="row" style="background:#b0e0e6;" | Kara Sea
| style="background:#b0e0e6;" | Passing just west of Uyedineniya Island (at )
|-
| 
! scope="row" | 
| Krasnoyarsk Krai — Pologyy-Sergeyeva Island
|-
| style="background:#b0e0e6;" | 
! scope="row" style="background:#b0e0e6;" | Kara Sea
| style="background:#b0e0e6;" |
|-
| 
! scope="row" | 
| Krasnoyarsk Krai — Arkticheskiy Institut Islands
|-
| style="background:#b0e0e6;" | 
! scope="row" style="background:#b0e0e6;" | Kara Sea
| style="background:#b0e0e6;" |
|-
| 
! scope="row" | 
| Krasnoyarsk Krai
|-
| style="background:#b0e0e6;" | 
! scope="row" style="background:#b0e0e6;" | Yenisei Gulf
| style="background:#b0e0e6;" |
|-valign="top"
| 
! scope="row" | 
| Krasnoyarsk Krai Yamalo-Nenets Autonomous Okrug — from  Krasnoyarsk Krai — from  Yamalo-Nenets Autonomous Okrug — from  Khanty-Mansi Autonomous Okrug — from  Tomsk Oblast — from  Novosibirsk Oblast — from  Altai Krai — from 
|-
| 
! scope="row" | 
|
|-valign="top"
| 
! scope="row" | 
| Xinjiang Tibet — from 
|-
| 
! scope="row" | 
|
|-valign="top"
| 
! scope="row" | 
| Uttar Pradesh Madhya Pradesh — from  Chhattisgarh — from  Madhya Pradesh — from  Chhattisgarh — from  Odisha — from  Chhattisgarh — from  Odisha — from  Andhra Pradesh — from 
|-valign="top"
| style="background:#b0e0e6;" | 
! scope="row" style="background:#b0e0e6;" | Indian Ocean
|-
| style="background:#b0e0e6;" | 
! scope="row" style="background:#b0e0e6;" | Southern Ocean
| style="background:#b0e0e6;" |
|-
| 
! scope="row" | Antarctica
| Australian Antarctic Territory, claimed by 
|-
| style="background:#b0e0e6;" | 
! scope="row" style="background:#b0e0e6;" | Southern Ocean
| style="background:#b0e0e6;" | Barrier Bay
|-
| 
! scope="row" | Antarctica
| Australian Antarctic Territory, claimed by 
|-
|}

See also
81st meridian east
83rd meridian east

e082 meridian east